Sophie Francine Hilbrand (born 5 October 1975) is a Dutch Television presenter, actress and radio host. She followed a course drama at De Trap, a private school for acting in Amsterdam, but left after one and a half year when she debuted on 6pack.

Television career 
She debuted on SBS 6 as part of the 6pack show. In 2004 Hilbrand joined broadcaster BNN.

References

External links 

1975 births
Living people
Dutch actresses
De Trap Theater Academy alumni
Dutch television presenters
People from Alkmaar
Dutch women television presenters
Dutch radio presenters
Dutch women radio presenters